Palmerston  may refer to:

People
 Christie Palmerston (c. 1851–1897), Australian explorer
 Several prominent people have borne the title of Viscount Palmerston
 Henry Temple, 1st Viscount Palmerston (c. 1673–1757), Irish nobleman and British politician
 Henry Temple, 2nd Viscount Palmerston (1739–1802), British politician
 Henry John Temple, 3rd Viscount Palmerston (1784–1865), British foreign minister and Prime Minister 
 Charles P. Anderson (1865–1930), Canadian bishop

Places

Australia
County of Palmerston, a cadastral division in the Northern Territory
 Palmerston, the name used for Darwin, Northern Territory prior to 1911
 Palmerston, Northern Territory, a city near Darwin in Australia
 Palmerston, Australian Capital Territory, a suburb of Canberra, Australia
 Palmerston, Queensland, a locality in the Cassowary Coast Region, Australia
 East Palmerston, Queensland, a locality in the Cassowary Coast Region, Australia
 Cape Palmerston, Queensland, Australia
 Palmerston Highway, in Queensland, Australia

Canada
 Palmerston, Ontario, a town in Ontario
 Mount Palmerston on Vancouver Island, British Columbia
 Palmerston Boulevard, a notable residential street in the city of Toronto, Ontario
 Palmerston Lake, a lake located in North Frontenac Township, Ontario

Ireland
 Palmerston, County Mayo, in Ireland
 Palmerston Park, Dublin, a park in the capital of Ireland

New Zealand
 Palmerston, New Zealand, a town in the Otago Region of the South Island
 Palmerston North, a city in the Manawatū-Wanganui Region of the North Island

Elsewhere
 Palmerston, Mutare, a suburb of Mutare, Zimbabwe
 Palmerston Island, an island in the Cook Islands
 Palmerston Park, home ground of Queen of the South F.C. in Dumfries, Scotland

Other uses 
 Palmerston (car), a British car manufactured during the 1920s
 Palmerston (cat), a mouser in the Foreign and Commonwealth Office at Whitehall, London
 Palmerston FC, an Australian association football team
 Palmerston Football Club, an Australian Aussie Rules team
 Palmerston Forts, also known as Palmerston's Follies, a series of 19th-century British defensive fortifications

See also
 Palmerstown (disambiguation)

English-language surnames